The Sportanlage Am Stern is a football stadium in the south-east of Potsdam, Germany.

Fortuna Babelsberg play their home games here.

External links 
 Pictures of the stadium at potsdam-abc.de

Football venues in Germany
Sport in Potsdam
Sports venues in Brandenburg